The 8th constituency of the Var (French: Huitième circonscription du Var) is a French legislative constituency in the Var département. Like the other 576 French constituencies, it elects one MP using the two-round system, with a run-off if no candidate receives over 50% of the vote in the first round.

Description

The 8th constituency of the Var covers the north of the department, it was created as a result of the 2010 redistricting of French legislative constituencies.

At the 2017 election the incumbent mainstream conservative The Republicans deputy came third in the first round behind both the Emmanuel Macron's En Marche! and the far right National Front.

Assembly Members

Election results

2022

 
 
 
|-
| colspan="8" bgcolor="#E9E9E9"|
|-

2017

 
 
 
 
 
 
|-
| colspan="8" bgcolor="#E9E9E9"|
|-

2012

 
 
 
 
 
 
|-
| colspan="8" bgcolor="#E9E9E9"|
|-

References

8